Sawamatsu (written: 沢松) is a Japanese surname. Notable people with the surname include:

, Japanese tennis player
, Japanese tennis player
, Japanese tennis player

Japanese-language surnames